List of British cruiserweight boxing champions is a table showing the boxers who have won the British cruiserweight title, which has been the British Boxing Board of Control (BBBoC) since 1985.

A champion will often voluntarily relinquish the title in order to fight for a higher-ranked championship, such as the world or European. Where the date on which a champion relinquished the title is unclear, the date of the last BBBoC sanctioned fight is shown.

r – Champion relinquished title.
s – Champion stripped of title.

See also
 List of British heavyweight boxing champions
 List of British light-heavyweight boxing champions
 List of British super-middleweight boxing champions
 List of British middleweight boxing champions
 List of British light-middleweight boxing champions
 List of British welterweight boxing champions
 List of British lightweight boxing champions
 List of British super-featherweight boxing champions
 List of British featherweight boxing champions
 List of British super-bantamweight boxing champions
 List of British bantamweight boxing champions
 List of British super-flyweight boxing champions
 List of British flyweight boxing champions
 List of British world boxing champions

External links
Cruiserweight champions

Cruise